Humbert Francis "Pat" Pasini (April 25, 1885 – September 26, 1964) was an American football, basketball, baseball, and track coach and college athletics administrator. He was the head football coach at Iowa State Teachers College—now known as the University of Northern Iowa–in Cedar Falls, Iowa from 1911 to 1912, King College—now known as King University—in Bristol, Tennessee from 1914 to 1915, Case Institute of Technology—now known as Case Western Reserve University—Cleveland, Ohio from 1917 to 1919, and Kenyon College in Gambier, Ohio in 1945.

Pasini attended Central High School in Cleveland and was a member of the 1905 basketball team. He later coached the team. Pasini attended Springfield College in Springfield, Massachusetts, where he played on the football, basketball, and baseball team. in 1914, he managed the Harriman Boosters of the Appalachian League, a Class D Minor League Baseball club.

Pasini died on September 26, 1964, at his home in Willoughby, Ohio.

Head coaching record

College football

References

External links
 

1885 births
1964 deaths
Basketball coaches from New York (state)
Case Western Spartans athletic directors
Case Western Spartans baseball coaches
Case Western Spartans football coaches
Case Western Spartans men's basketball coaches
Kenyon Lords and Ladies athletic directors
Kenyon Lords football coaches
Kenyon Lords basketball coaches
King Tornado football coaches
King Tornado men's basketball coaches
Minor league baseball managers
Northern Iowa Panthers baseball coaches
Northern Iowa Panthers football coaches
Northern Iowa Panthers men's basketball coaches
College men's basketball head coaches in the United States
College track and field coaches in the United States
Springfield Pride baseball players
Springfield Pride football players
Springfield Pride men's basketball players
Basketball players from Buffalo, New York
Baseball players from Buffalo, New York
Players of American football from Buffalo, New York